This article lists the results for the Japan national football team between 2010 and 2019.

* Japan score always listed first

2010

2011

2012

2013

2014

2015

2016

2017

2018

2019

See also
Japan at the Copa América

References

External links
 List of International matches of Japan, JFA.jp 

Japan national football team results
2010s in Japanese sport